The Department of Finance is a part of the Government of New Brunswick.  It is charged with New Brunswick's budgetary and tax policy and headed by the finance minister.

The department, or a minister responsible for this area, has existed in one form or another since the creation of New Brunswick as a crown colony in 1784.  It has been called Provincial Treasurer and Provincial Secretary-Treasurer in the past.

Ministers since the establishment of parties in 1935

External links

Department of Finance

Finance